Chance Russell Myers (born December 7, 1987 in Thousand Oaks, California) is an American former soccer player.

Career

College and amateur
Myers attended Thousand Oaks High School, and played college soccer at UCLA from 2006 to 2007. Over two years he started in 26 of his 42 appearances and managed 4 goals and 4 assists. During his college years he also played in the USL Premier Development League with Ventura County Fusion.

Professional
Leaving school early, Myers was drafted with the first overall pick of the 2008 MLS SuperDraft by Kansas City Wizards and signed for $130,000. He made his MLS debut on April 9, 2008 against the New England Revolution, but struggled to maintain a consistent place in the starting lineup due to a series of injuries and a new diagnosis of asthma.

It was announced on November 18, 2010 that Myers would graduate from the MLS Generation Adidas program at the end of the 2010 season. He scored his first two professional goals on May 25, 2011 in a 5-0 win over New England Revolution in the 2011 Lamar Hunt U.S. Open Cup.

After his release from Kansas City at the end of 2016 season, Myers signed with Portland Timbers as a free agent on January 23, 2017.

Myers was waived by the Timbers on February 28, 2018.

Post-retirement

In 2019, Myers joined Nashville SC as the team's chief scout.

Honors

Sporting Kansas City
 Lamar Hunt U.S. Open Cup: 2012
Major League Soccer MLS Cup Champion (1): 2013

References

External links
 

1987 births
Living people
American soccer players
UCLA Bruins men's soccer players
Ventura County Fusion players
Sporting Kansas City players
Sporting Kansas City II players
People from Thousand Oaks, California
Portland Timbers players
Portland Timbers 2 players
University of California, Los Angeles alumni
Footballers at the 2007 Pan American Games
Sporting Kansas City draft picks
USL League Two players
Major League Soccer first-overall draft picks
Major League Soccer players
USL Championship players
United States men's youth international soccer players
United States men's under-20 international soccer players
United States men's under-23 international soccer players
Sportspeople from Ventura County, California
Association football defenders
Pan American Games competitors for the United States